The Karakoram Highway (known by its initials KKH, also known as N-35 or National Highway 35 or the China-Pakistan Friendship Highway) is a  national highway which extends from Hasan Abdal in the Punjab province of Pakistan to the Khunjerab Pass in Gilgit-Baltistan, where it crosses into China and becomes China National Highway 314. The highway connects the Pakistani provinces of Punjab and Khyber Pakhtunkhwa plus Gilgit-Baltistan with China's Xinjiang Uyghur Autonomous Region. Due to its high elevation and the difficult conditions under which it was constructed, it is often referred to as the Eighth Wonder of the World. The highway is also a part of the Asian Highway AH4.

History 

The Karakoram Highway, also known as the Friendship Highway in China, was built by the governments of Pakistan and China. It was started in 1962 and was completed and opened to the public in 1978. Pakistan initially favored routing through Mintaka Pass. In 1966, China, citing the fact that Mintaka would be more susceptible to air strikes, recommended the steeper Khunjerab Pass instead. About 810 Pakistanis and about 200 Chinese workers died, mostly in landslides and falls, while building the highway. Over 140 Chinese workers who died during the construction are buried in the Chinese cemetery in Gilgit. The route of the KKH traces one of the many paths of the ancient Silk Road.

On the Pakistani side, the road was constructed by FWO (Frontier Works Organisation), employing the Pakistan Army Corps of Engineers. The Engineer-in-Chief's Branch of the Pakistani Army completed a project documenting the history of the highway. The book History of Karakoram Highway was written by Brigadier (Retired) Muhammad Mumtaz Khalid in two volumes. In the first volume, the author discusses the land and the people, the pre-historic communication system in the Northern Areas, the need for an all-weather road link with Gilgit, and the construction of Indus Valley Road. The second volume records events leading to the conversion of the Indus Valley Road to the Karakoram Highway, the difficulties in its construction, and the role of the Pakistan Army Corps of Engineers and their Chinese counterparts in its construction.

The Highway 

An extension of the highway southwest from Abbottabad, in the form of the N-35 highway, meets the Grand Trunk Road, N-5, at Hasan Abdal, Pakistan.

The highway cuts through the collision zone between the Eurasian and Indian plates, where China, Tajikistan, Afghanistan, and Pakistan come within  of each other. Owing largely to the extremely sensitive state of the Kashmir conflict between India and Pakistan, the Karakoram Highway has strategic and military importance to these nations, but particularly Pakistan and China.

On 30 June 2006, a memorandum of understanding was signed between the Pakistani National Highway Authority (NHA) and China's State-owned Assets Supervision and Administration Commission (SASAC) to rebuild and upgrade the Karakoram Highway. In addition, the upgraded road will be designed to particularly accommodate heavy-laden vehicles and extreme weather conditions.

China and Pakistan are planning to link the Karakoram Highway to the southern port of Gwadar in Balochistan through the Chinese-aided Gwadar-Dalbandin railway, which extends to Rawalpindi.

On 4 January 2010, the KKH was closed in the Hunza Valley, eliminating through traffic to China except by small boats. The landslide destroyed parts of villages while killing many inhabitants.

It is highly questionable whether the lake, which reached  in length in 2011, will drain. Goods from and to further north were transported over the lake by small vessels, to be reloaded onto trucks at the other end. In July 2012, Pakistan began constructing a revised route around the lake at a higher elevation with five new tunnels, with a total length of 7.12 km and two new bridges. The work was contracted out to the China Road & Bridge Corporation (CRBC) and was completed in September 2015.

Pakistani section 

At  in length, the Pakistani section of the highway starts at Abbottabad, although the N-35 of which KKH is now part, officially starts from Hasan Abdal. The highway meets the Indus River at Thakot and continues along the river until Jaglot, where the Gilgit River joins the Indus River. This is where three great mountain ranges meet: the Hindukush, the Himalayas, and the Karakoram. The western end of the Himalayas, marked by the ninth highest peak in the world, Nanga Parbat, can be seen from the highway. The highway passes through the capital of Gilgit–Baltistan, Gilgit, and continues through the valleys of Nagar and Hunza, along the Hunza River. Some of the highest mountains and famous glaciers in Karakoram can be seen in this section. The highway meets the Pakistani-Chinese border at Khunjerab Pass.

Karakoram Highway reconstruction 

	

As part of the $46 billion China Pakistan Economic Corridor, reconstruction and upgrade works on the Pakistani portion of the Karakoram Highway (KKH) are underway. At Burhan Interchange near Hasan Abdal, the existing M1 motorway will intersect the Karakoram Highway. From there, access onwards to Islamabad and Lahore continues as part of the existing M1 and M2 motorways, while Hasan Abdal will also be at intersection of the Eastern Alignment, and the Western Alignment which will lead towards the port city of Gwadar.

Karakoram Highway Realignment (China-Pakistan Friendship Tunnels) 
A large section of the highway was damaged by a landslide in 2010 that created Attabad Lake. The resulting landslides cut off both the Hunza River and Karakoram Highway resulting in the formation of the reservoir. Prior to the completion of the bypass, all vehicular traffic had to be loaded onto boats to traverse the new reservoir. Construction of the tunnels began in 2012 and required 36 months for completion. The route comprises five tunnels and several bridges. The realignment restored the road link between Pakistan and China.

Chinese section 

The Chinese section of the Karakoram Highway follows the north-south Sarykol ("Yellow Lake") valley just west of the Tarim Basin. From the Gez canyon the population becomes Kirgiz. Having climbed up to the valley, the road turns south past Kongur, Karakul Lake, and Muztagh Ata on the east. Below Muztagh Ata, a new road goes west over the Kulma Pass to join the Pamir Highway in Gorno-Badakhshan, Tajikistan. The main road continues over a low pass (where the population becomes Tajik) and descends to Tashkurgan. Further south, a valley and jeep track leads west toward the Wakhjir Pass to the Wakhan Corridor. Next the road turns west to a checkpost and small settlement at Pirali, and then the Khunjerab Pass, beyond which is Pakistan, the Khunjerab River and Hunza.

Major towns near Karakoram Highway 

 Rawalpindi Islamabad Pakistan railhead,  gauge

 Hassan Abdal
 Haripur
 Abbottabad
 Mansehra
 Battagram
 Besham
 Pattan
 Kohistan
 Dasu
 Chilas
 Juglot
 Gilgit
 Naltar Valley
 Nagar
 Aliabad
 Gulmit
 Sust
 Tashkurgan (China)
 Upal (China)
 Kashgar, Chinese railhead,  gauge

Tourism 
In recent years the highway has sought to become a 'niche' adventure tourism destination although Pakistan attracts few international tourists compared to domestic ones. But in recent years, owing to the improved security situation in the country, the number of foreign tourists coming to Pakistan has more than tripled since 2013, standing at 1.75 million in 2016.

Among the tourist destinations in the country, KKH is deemed as the "third best" by The Guardian. The road has given mountaineers and cyclists easier access to the many high mountains, glaciers, and lakes in the area. The highway provides access to Gilgit and Skardu from Islamabad by road. These are the two major hubs for mountaineering expeditions in the Gilgit–Baltistan region of Pakistan administered Kashmir.

The Gilgit–Baltistan Administration of Pakistan-administered Kashmir and the Xinjiang Administration of China have signed an agreement to issue border passes to their permanent residents. This pass is valid for a calendar year and is used to travel through Khunjerab Pass only. Karakoram Highway has been described as one of the most beautiful destinations in the world. KKH provides a cross country road trip from Hasan Abdal, Pakistan to Kashghar.

Naltar Valley is one of the most scenic valleys accessed via Karakoram Highway. The valley offers snow clad mountains, sky high peaks, alpine ski slopes, high altitude lakes, glaciers and mountain passes. Bishgiri Lake is one of the highest lakes in Pakistan. While Pakora Pass is famous for its glaciers and meadows.

Mountains and glaciers 

Karakoram Highway provides the pathway to expeditions for almost all peaks in Gilgit–Baltistan, Kashmir and several peaks in Xinjiang China. The region includes some of the world's largest glaciers like the Baltoro and Siachen Glaciers. Two of the Eight-thousanders (mountains taller than ) of the world that are in Pakistan are accessible by the highway. The notable mountains that can be directly seen while travelling on the highway are:

 Nanga Parbat, Gilgit–Baltistan, 9th highest of the world at 
 Rakaposhi, Gilgit–Baltistan, 27th highest of the world at 
 Diran, Gilgit–Baltistan, most dangerous mountain in Pakistan
 Shishpar, Gilgit–Baltistan
 Ultar Peak, Gilgit–Baltistan 
 Tupopdan, Gilgit–Baltistan, also known as Cathedral Peaks near Passu

Many glaciers can be seen while travelling on the highway:

 Minapin Glacier
 Passu Glacier
 Ghulkin Glacier
 Khunjerab Glacier

Rivers and lakes 
Several rivers and lakes are made accessible by the highway. These include:
 Indus River
 Hunza River
 Attabad Lake
 Gilgit River
 Khunjerab River
 Karakul Lake in Xinjiang (China)

Rock art and petroglyphs 

There are more than 50,000 pieces of rock art and petroglyphs all along the highway that are concentrated at ten major sites between Hunza and Shatial. The carvings were left by invaders, traders, and pilgrims who passed along the trade route, as well as by locals. The earliest date back to between 5000 and 1000 BC, showing single animals, triangular men, and hunting scenes in which the animals are larger than the hunters. These carvings were pecked into the rock with stone tools and are covered with a thick patina that yields their age.

Travel 
There are several transport companies in Pakistan that offer bus service between major towns of the highway and from Rawalpindi and Lahore. The largest company is Northern Areas Transport Corporation (NATCO). Other companies are Masherbrum Travel, Silk Route Travel, K-2 movers, Anchan Travel, and Saeed Travel.

Bus service between Gilgit and Kashghar 
On 1 June 2006, daily bus service began between Gilgit, Gilgit–Baltistan, and Kashghar, Xinjiang, through the Sust and Tashkorgan border area.

Climate 

The KKH is best travelled in the spring or early autumn. Heavy snow during harsh winters can shut the highway down for extended periods. Heavy monsoon rains around July and August cause occasional landslides that can block the road for hours or more. The border crossing between China and Pakistan at Khunjerab Pass is open only between 1 May and 31 December.

Alternate road (Xinjiang-GB-Azad Kashmir road)
The proposed Xinjiang-GB-Azad Kashmir road would be linked to Yarkant County in Xinjiang, and enter Gilgit-Baltistan through Mustagh Pass, 126 km west of Ladakh, crossing the major supply artery from the Karakoram Highway near Skardu city. From there, it would run south through the high-altitude Deosai Plateau to the Astore Valley.  A road tunnel is proposed to be constructed through the mountains to connect Astore to the Neelum Valley in the Azad Kashmir region.

See also 
 Attabad Lake
 Edicts of Ashoka
 Gilgit
 Gilgit–Baltistan
 Hunza Valley
 Karakoram
 Karakoram Pass
 Kashghar
 Kashmir
 Jammu–Baramulla line
 Ladakh
 Leh–Manali Highway
 Araniko Highway
 NH 22 – An alternate route for access to the Arabian Sea from China
 National Highways of Pakistan
 Pamir Highway
 Shandur
 Silk Road (section "Overland routes")
 Skardu
 Xinjiang

Notes

References

External links

 Video of Karakoram Highway.
 Urdu: Safar Hai Shart A documentary on Karakoram Highway 8th wonder of the world
 History of KKH by Brigadier (Retired) Mumtaz Khalid (Pakistan Army Corps of Engineers)
 Blankonthemap The Northern Kashmir WebSite
 Burzine Waghmar's notes on the KKH and review of Tahir Jahangir A Travel Companion to the Northern Areas of Pakistan, OUP, 2004
 Northern Areas Development Gateway
 Pakistan's Northern Areas
 Karakoram Highway Map
 A good brief description of the highway
 Photographic Account of Journey through KKH
 Karakoram Highway Road Trip Cross Country Adventure In Gilgit Baltistan

N-35
N-35
Transport in Xinjiang
Transport in Gilgit-Baltistan
China–Pakistan border crossings
Sites along the Silk Road
Karakoram
Government of Zulfikar Ali Bhutto
China–Pakistan Economic Corridor